Brain Blockers is a 2007 horror film directed by Lincoln Kupchak.  Edwin Craig plays a professor who experiments on his college students and turns them into zombies.

Plot 
A college professor, Dr. Douglas Newton, develops an experimental drug named Tryptophan (not to be confused with real Tryptophan) that has the side effect of turning his students into bloodthirsty zombie-like creatures, leading them to eventually explode. It is up to a couple of grad students, Jenny Wayne and Joe Larsen, along with the local newspaper reporter Ray Elsworth, to uncover Dr. Newton's dark secret and thwart his  plans before time runs out.

Cast 
 Timmi Cragg as Jenny Wayne
 Matt Shevin as Joe Larsen
 Edwin Craig as Dr. Douglas Newton
 Ned Liebl as Ray Elseworth
 Crystal Day as Becky
 Diora Baird as Suzi Klein
 Timothy L. Arnold as Tommy Martin
 Allison Evans as Emma Greenberg
 John W. Allen as John Cotton
 Jana Thompson as Shannon Braithwaite
 Jon Brooks as Billy Hobson
 Molly Hawkey as Lacey Wilcox
 Stacy Lynn Gabel as Rachel
 Kaley Dobson as Tammy
 John Klemantaski as Dr. Daniel Fannen
 Dillon Frehener as James Fannen

Release 
Brain Blockers was released on DVD on March 15, 2007. The DVD version contains deleted scenes, a still gallery and the "Brain Blockers" music video by the band Le Mans.

Reception 
Kryten Syxx of Dread Central rated the film 1/5 stars and called it one of the worst zombie Z movies that site had reviewed.  Steve Anderson of Film Threat rated the film 1/5 stars and stated that the film fails at both horror and comedy.  Academic Peter Dendle wrote that it is "a mind-numbing indie effort" with "inconsistent mutant creatures and awful special effects." A more positive review by Gavin Schmitt of Killer Reviews gave the film 3.5/5 stars and said "the overall story is really good" and singled out "the film`s seemingly endless supply of gorgeous women".

References

External links
 
 

2007 films
American comedy horror films
American independent films
Mad scientist films
American zombie comedy films
2007 comedy horror films
Parodies of horror
2000s English-language films
2000s American films